Vladimir "Senjko" Ćopić (8 March 1891 – 19 April 1939) was a Yugoslav revolutionary, politician, journalist and communist leader of the Communist Party of Yugoslavia from April 1919 to August 1920.

Biography
Born into a family of mixed Croat and Serb descent from Senj, Croatia-Slavonia as part of Austria-Hungary, Ćopić had been conscripted into the Austro-Hungarian army during World War I, and subsequently captured by the Russian Red Army. He was a chess player and musician and had briefly been a communist deputy in Yugoslavia. Later, under the name of 'Senko', he had been a leading member of the Yugoslav Communist Party in Moscow.

Spanish Civil War
In February 1937, Colonel Gal was promoted to General to command a division and was replaced as commander and political commissar of the XV International Brigade by Ćopić. He was one of the highest ranking Yugoslav volunteers in the war.

On the Battle of Jarama, the official report by Ćopić of fighting on 12 February, barely mentioned the appalling level of casualties under his command, but focused on the 'staunch heroism' of his troops repelling 'violent fascist attacks causing heavy losses on the enemy'. The final act of the Battle was the futile attack by the Lincoln Battalion on 27 February. The battalion commander, Captain Robert Hale Merriman begged Ćopić (described as "rather inept") not to launch the attack fearing slaughter. Ćopić insisted it proceed and promised air and armoured support, which never came. Merriman was almost immediately wounded and the Battalion suffered 136 deaths.

In August 1937 at the Battle of Belchite, he tasked Peter Daly's unit with capturing the town of Quinto and they were commanded on 25 August to capture Purburrel Hill, a height south of the town, on which 500 Rebel troops were entrenched behind barbed wire and concrete pill-boxes. Finding themselves unsupported and outnumbered against the defenders, the unit took heavy casualties and Peter Daly was wounded in the abdomen. Daly was taken away for aid while Paddy O'Daire took charge refusing the orders of his superior, Ćopić, to continue the suicidal attack, keeping his men dug in on the exposed hillside until nightfall and safe withdrawal. On the 26 August O'Daire, this time supported by the XV International Brigade's anti-tank battery, succeeded in breaking the enemy lines, leading to the capture of 300 troops.

By April 1938 Spanish communist leaders wanted the replacement of many International Brigade commanders due to poor performance, and although André Marty disagreed, he had to compromise and General Walter and Ćopić were replaced.

Following the end of the war and Republicans' defeat, he was recalled to Moscow. Due to his Trotskyist views regarding communist governance, he was killed in Stalinist purges in 1939 along with many other leading Yugoslav communists in the country.

His brother, Milan Ćopić, was in the International Brigades' prison at Camp Lucász.

References and sources

External links
 Photo of Vladimir Ćopić - Senjko

1891 births
1939 deaths
People from Senj
Serbs of Croatia
Soviet people of the Spanish Civil War
Croatian people of the Spanish Civil War
League of Communists of Croatia politicians
International Lenin School alumni
International Brigades personnel
Austro-Hungarian military personnel of World War I
Great Purge victims from Yugoslavia
Executed communists